Daniel Lurie is an American philanthropist who is the founder and CEO of Tipping Point Community.

Biography
Lurie was born and raised in a Jewish family in San Francisco, the son of Mimi (née Ruchwarger) and Rabbi Brian Lurie. His parents divorced when he was two and his mother remarried to Peter E. Haas. His father was executive director of the Jewish Community Federation of San Francisco. He has one brother, Ari Lurie. He attended the Town School for Boys and University High School in San Francisco. He graduated with a B.A. in political science from Duke University. After school, he worked on Bill Bradley's 2000 presidential campaign where he worked as a field organizer in Iowa. In 2001, he moved to New York City to work for the Robin Hood Foundation, founded by Paul Tudor Jones. In 2003, he returned to San Francisco where he received his M.P.P. from the Goldman School of Public Policy at University of California, Berkeley in 2005; his thesis consisted of a business plan for a charitable foundation based on the Robin Hood model. After he graduated, he founded the Tipping Point Community raising $65 million from donors. Other founding members of the board were Ronnie Lott, Katie Schwab Paige (daughter of Charles R. Schwab), and Chris James (founder of Partner Fund Management). Tipping Point focuses on education, housing, employment, and family wellness and every dollar received is spent within the year. He was named by San Francisco Mayor Ed Lee to lead the San Francisco Bay Area Super Bowl Bid Committee; after a successful bid, he was able to ensure that 25% of revenue was designated to local non-profits to help fight poverty. As of 2017, Tipping Point has raised $120 million to date raising $21.9 million in the current year.

In 2017, Lurie committed to raising $100 million in two years to reducing San Francisco's homeless population by 50%; Tipping Point was successful in its efforts and spent the first $27 million in 2018.

On November 16, 2019, Tipping Point Community announced that Lurie will step down as CEO after 15 years of leading the organization. Sam Cobbs, Tipping Point’s president, will succeed Lurie as CEO on January 6, 2020. Lurie will remain with Tipping Point as chair of the board.

Personal life
In 2006, Lurie married Becca Prowda; they have a son and a daughter. In 2019, his wife was named Director of Protocol by California Governor Gavin Newsom.

References

Living people
Jewish American philanthropists
Haas family
Duke University Trinity College of Arts and Sciences alumni
People from San Francisco
Year of birth missing (living people)
1970s births
Goldman School of Public Policy alumni